Bahamas participated in the 2010 Summer Youth Olympics in Singapore.

Medalists

Athletics

Boys
Track and Road Events

Field Events

Girls
Track and Road Events

Field Events

Judo

Individual

Team

Swimming

References

External links
Competitors List: Bahamas

Nations at the 2010 Summer Youth Olympics
2010
Youth Olympics